"Meet the Woggels!" is the seventeenth episode of the sixth season of the American television comedy series 30 Rock, and the 120th overall episode of the series. It was directed by Linda Mendoza, and written by Ron Weiner. The episode originally aired on NBC in the United States on April 12, 2012.

In the episode, Jack's mother becomes seriously ill, forcing him to confront his feelings for her; Jenna (Jane Krakowski) dates a member of a children's musical group; and Tracy (Tracy Morgan) laments that his son is going to attend college.

Plot
During the opening of his couch factory, Jack (Alec Baldwin) discovers that his mother has been hospitalized in New York for a heart ailment. Jack initially rebuffs Liz's advice that his mother is clearly ill and is trying to orchestrate "the talk" about their true feelings for each other. They eventually have that talk, which greatly satisfies Liz.

Jenna (Jane Krakowski) is attempting to do everything on her "sexual walkabout" checklist. She fulfills several items by dating a popular children's entertainer (Clarke Thorell) and "Yokoing" his band.  She realizes that the whole enterprise is a poor substitute for boyfriend Paul. On Liz's advice, Jenna goes over to Paul's to tell him this. However, she catches a glimpse of Paul intimately involved with another woman and an anthropomorphic couch. She leaves heartbroken.

Tracy (Tracy Morgan) is mortified to learn that his oldest son, George Foreman, is planning to attend Stanford University. Fearful that his son has been "coddled" into becoming a nerd, he takes him around for the day to show him how Jordan men behave and induct him into his entourage. Although George, who has never spent much time with Tracy, is tempted to stay, Tracy eventually hints that he should go to college after all.

Cultural references
The children's band featured in the episode are called The Woggels, a reference to real-life Australian children's band The Wiggles.

Reception
This episode's premiere was viewed by 3.09 million people. The A.V. Club gave the episode a B+.

References

External links
 

30 Rock (season 6) episodes